Gorvagh (Garvagh; Irish Garbhach) is a townland in County Leitrim, Ireland. It belongs to the barony and parish of Mohill with St. Josephs church situated on a hill overlooking the main Mohill Ballinamore road (R202) which traverses the area.

Gorvagh is known for its lakes, with fishing popular amongst the locals and tourists.

Neighbouring townlands are (from the north in clockwise direction) Seltan, Annaghderg Lower, Adoon, Shivdilla, Gubadruish, Sratrissaun North, and Corrabeagh. The tripoint of Gorvagh, Corrabeagh, and Seltan is located on a small island in Seltan Lough.

External links
Gorvagh information at Mohill Parish website

Townlands of County Leitrim